The 2001 Tipperary Senior Hurling Championship was the 111th staging of the Tipperary Senior Hurling Championship since its establishment by the Tipperary County Board in 1887. The championship ran from 14 October to 11 November 2001.

Toomevara were the defending champions.

On 11 November 2001, Toomevara won the title after a 1-22 to 1-13 defeat of Thurles Sarsfields in the final at Semple Stadium. It was their 17th championship title overall and their fourth title in succession.

Results

Quarter-finals

Semi-finals

Final

Championship statistics

Top scorers

Top scorers overall

Top scorers in a single game

Miscellaneous
 Toomevara become the first team to win four in a row since Thurles Sarsfields between 1961-64.
 Loughmore-Castleiney was thrown out of the championship for refusing to play extra time in their drawn quarter-final against Toomevara. A successful appeal to the Munster Council allowed the club to be subsequently reinstated.

References

Tipperary Senior Hurling Championship
Tipperary